Bohemannia pulverosella is a moth of the family Nepticulidae. It is found from Fennoscandia to the Iberian Peninsula, the Alps, Slovenia and Bulgaria and from Ireland to central Russia and Ukraine.

The wingspan is 6–7 mm. The head is ferruginous-yellowish. Antennal eyecaps whitish. Forewings are shining pale ochreous-greyish, coarsely irrorated with dark fuscous ; outer part of apical cilia whitish. Hindwings are light grey.

The yellowish larvae feed on apple (Malus domestica), Malus x purpurea and European crab apple (Malus sylvestris). They mine the leaves of their host plant which consists of a narrow, strongly contorted corridor. The corridor abruptly widens into an elongate blotch, that often runs over the initial corridor. The frass is brown and almost fills the initial corridor. In the blotch, the frass is concentrated in the first section. Pupation takes place outside of the mine. The larva cuts an exit hole on the underside of the leaf, which distinguishes the mine from that of Ectoedemia atricollis.

Gallery

Reference

 Meyrick, E., 1895 A Handbook of British Lepidoptera MacMillan, London pdf  Keys and description

External links
 Swedish moths

Nepticulidae
Leaf miners
Moths described in 1849
Moths of Europe
Taxa named by Henry Tibbats Stainton